Psylliostachys is a genus of flowering plants belonging to the family Plumbaginaceae.

Its native range is South European Russia, Pakistan and Temperate Asia.

Species:
 Psylliostachys × afghanicus Roshkova 
 Psylliostachys anceps (Regel) Roshkova 
 Psylliostachys × androssovii Roshkova 
 Psylliostachys beludshistanicus Roshkova 
 Psylliostachys leptostachyus (Boiss.) Roshkova 
 Psylliostachys × myosuroides (Regel) Roshkova 
 Psylliostachys spicatus (Willd.) Nevski 
 Psylliostachys suworowii (Regel) Roshkova 
 Psylliostachys volkii Rech.f.

References

Plumbaginaceae
Caryophyllales genera